Razor Songs is a retrospective compilation album of non-singles tracks by Australian pub rock band Cold Chisel, released in 1987. The album was certified platinum in Australia in 1997.

Track listing
all tracks written by Don Walker, unless otherwise stated.
 A1	"Home and Broken Hearted" - 3:26
 A2	"Standing on the Outside" - 2:53
 A3	"Conversations" - 4:51
 A4	"Hold Me Tight" - 1:42
 A5	"Ghost Town" - 1:20
 A6	"My Turn to Cry" (Jimmy Barnes) - 3:18
 B1	"Houndog" - 4:54
 B2	"Painted Doll" - 2:19
 B3	"Rising Sun" (Jimmy Barnes) - 3:24
 B4	"Merry Go Round" - 3:45
 B5	"Wild Thing" (Chip Taylor) - 5:00

Charts

Certifications

References

1987 compilation albums
Compilation albums by Australian artists
Cold Chisel albums